Bismutite or bismuthite is a bismuth carbonate mineral with formula Bi2(CO3)O2 (bismuth subcarbonate). Bismutite occurs as an oxidation product of other bismuth minerals such as bismuthinite and native bismuth in hydrothermal veins and pegmatites. It crystallizes in the orthorhombic system and typically occurs as earthy to fibrous masses.

It was first described in 1841 for an occurrence in Saxony.

The term bismuthite has been used in the past for bismuthinite.

References 

Carbonate minerals
Bismuth minerals
Orthorhombic minerals
Minerals in space group 71